Diving at the 2014 Summer Youth Olympics was held from 23 to 27 August at the Nanjing Olympic Sports Centre in Nanjing, China.

Qualification

Each National Olympic Committee (NOC) could gain a maximum of 4 quotas, 1 per each event and enter 2 athletes, 1 in each gender. As hosts, China was given the maximum quota. 8 athletes, 2 in each event was decided by the Tripartite Commission, but none were given thus the spots were reallocated to the next best athletes not yet qualified. The remaining 36 places were decided in a single qualifying event held in 2014.

Athletes must have been born between 1 January 1996 and 31 December 1998 to be eligible to participate at the 2014 Youth Olympics,.

3m Springboard

10m Platform

Schedule
The schedule was released by the Nanjing Youth Olympic Games Organizing Committee.

All times are CST (UTC+8)

Medal summary

Medal table

Results

References

External links
Official Results Book – Diving

 
2014 Summer Youth Olympics events
Youth Summer Olympics
2014
Diving competitions in China